Ronago is a comune (municipality) in the Province of Como in the Italian region Lombardy, located about  northwest of Milan and about  west of Como, on the border with Switzerland.

Ronago borders the following municipalities: Chiasso (Switzerland), Colverde, Novazzano (Switzerland), Uggiate-Trevano.

References

External links
Official website

Cities and towns in Lombardy